María Antonieta Pérez Reyes (born 14 January 1963) is a Mexican politician. From 2009 to 2012, she served as Deputy of the LXI Legislature of the Mexican Congress representing Chihuahua.

References

1963 births
Living people
People from Ciudad Juárez
Women members of the Chamber of Deputies (Mexico)
National Action Party (Mexico) politicians
21st-century Mexican politicians
21st-century Mexican women politicians
Politicians from Chihuahua (state)
Instituto Tecnológico de Ciudad Juárez alumni
Deputies of the LXI Legislature of Mexico
Members of the Chamber of Deputies (Mexico) for Chihuahua (state)